DCTC is the Dakota County Technical College.

DCTC may also refer to:

Denver Center Theatre Company
Dow Corning Tennis Classic, ITF Women's Circuit tennis tournament
Direct Connect Text Client, known as DCTC
District of Columbia Transplant Community, known as DCTC